Hasroun (also Hasrun or Hasroon, Arabic: حصرون ) is a village located in the Bsharri District in the North Governorate of Lebanon. It is situated in the Valley of Qadisha, overlooking the southern branch of this valley, the Qannoubine Valley.

It owes its nickname of the Rose of Mount Lebanon to its predominantly red-tiled roof houses. The population is Maronite Catholic.

Hasroun gave the Maronite Church two Patriarchs, Patriarch Jacob Aouad (1705-1733) and Patriarch Simon Aouad (1743-1756). From Hasroun came also the noted family of orientalists, the Assemani, among them the famous Giuseppe Simone Assemani, author of Bibliotheca Orientalis and Ephraemi Syri opera omnia quae extant.

Twin Towns
 Marmaris, Turkey

External links
Hasroun, Localiban
 Hasroun website 
 Hasroun website 

Populated places in the North Governorate
Bsharri District
Maronite Christian communities in Lebanon